Tōsha may refer to:

Tōsha Meishō (born 1941), Japanese hayashi musician, providing musical accompaniment in the kabuki theatre
Tōsha Roei (born 1966), Japanese percussionist in the tradition of traditional Japanese drama and dance
Tōsha Rosen VI (born 1944), Japanese percussionist in the tradition of traditional Japanese dance and drama
Tosha, a character from Barney & Friends